Luta Livre (lit. freestyle fighting), known in Brazil as Luta Livre Brasileira (lit. Brazilian freestyle fighting) or Luta Livre Submission, and also Brazilian Submission Wrestling, is a Brazilian martial arts and combat sport created by Euclydes Hatem in Rio de Janeiro. Primarily a mixture of catch wrestling and kosen judo, there is also ground striking with the hands, feet, knees and elbows. Notable practitioners include Marco Ruas, Ebenezer Fontes Braga, Johil de Oliveira, Alexandre Franca Nogueira, Renato Sobral, Gesias Cavalcante, Pedro Rizzo, Darren Till and José Aldo.

There are two styles: esportiva ("sporting") and combate ("ground strikes"); both styles are no-gi. In esportiva competitions, grappling techniques are the only techniques allowed to subdue the opponent.  Consequently, it is important to calmly strategize and execute moves with the aim to force the opponent to submit via armlock, leglock, choke or necklock, or to win by points (i.e. takedowns, domination position). Punches, kicks and other "hard" techniques are not allowed as this is considered more a sport than actual combat. Combate, on the other hand, includes striking techniques on the ground; palm strikes and kicks are allowed, but the ground fight and submissions are still the largest elements. This is also the form used in MMA-style fights.

Etymology  
In Brazil, the name "Luta Livre" (lit. freestyle fighting) can be used for multiple styles of wrestling. Olympic Freestyle Wrestling is known as Luta Livre Olímpica (lit. olympic freestyle fighting), while Professional wrestling is called Luta Livre Profissional or simply Luta Livre, sometimes also referred as Telecatch. Catch-as-Catch-Can wrestling was introduced to Brazil in the early 20th century and received the name "Luta Livre Americana" (lit. American freestyle fighting) to differentiate from Greco-Roman wrestling, as there was no forbidden holds or moves, thus "livre" ("free"). Later due the influence of Euclydes Hatem and other practitioners, Luta Livre started to diverge from Catch Wrestling (which was becoming predetermined professional wrestling) and becoming its own style of submission grappling, with its practitioners maintaining the moniker of "Luta Livre".

To clear the confusion, in the modern day some Luta Livre schools have adopted the name of "Luta Livre Submission" while others use "Luta Livre Esportiva" in order to differentiate from other similarly named fighting styles.

History
Luta Livre's founder is credited to be Euclydes "Tatu" Hatem, who was originally a catch wrestler.  Euclydes Hatem went by the name of Tatu.  He began teaching catch wrestling techniques to others in Rio de Janeiro in 1927 while experimenting with some of his own innovative techniques. Tatu brought on many challenges with the Brazilian jiu-jitsu and culminated with his victory over George Gracie in the Catch rules fight. The style emphasized fighting without a gi/uniform. He received popularity when he submitted George Gracie in 1940 and when one of his students, Euclides Pereira defeated Carlson Gracie in 1968. The system focused on ground fighting and submissions due to their importance in Vale Tudo matches. The ground fighting included the use of leg locks, which at the time was ignored by Brazilian Jiu-Jitsu. For years, Luta Livre was extremely popular in Brazil, second only to Brazilian Jiu-Jitsu.  Some of the famous fighters that came out of Luta Livre included William Porfirio. In the 1970s Luta Livre was strongly influenced by father and son duo Fausto and Carlos Brunocilla. The Brunocilla were Tatu's pupils and were in turn responsible for graduating many Luta Livre Masters. Also around the 1970s, the art of Luta Livre was influenced by Roberto Leitão, a practitioner of judo and wrestling. Leitão also articulated the "Theory of Grappling", sometimes referred to as "Theory of Luta Livre". Roberto Leitão was a university professor of Engineering who had devoted many years to Wrestling and Judo.

Luta Livre and Brazilian jiu-jitsu
Luta Livre, in its early days, was largely considered to be an art "for poor kids who could not afford a gi."  due to appearances since they didn't fight with a gi. Luta Livre and BJJ were considered to be enemies.  When Euclides Perreria beat Carlson Gracie in 1968 , the rivalry was continued for a few more decades. It was actually very popular amongst kids from the favelas. Luta Livre focused on teaching the poor who were primarily of African descent. This was opposed to Brazilian jiu-jitsu which was thought to focus on teaching of the upper class, who were primarily light skinned. The battles between the two arts was essentially a class warfare. By the 1980s, Gracie Jiu-Jitsu had become very popular in Brazil and Luta Livre representatives wanted to help popularize their art by accepting challenges from Brazilian jiu-jitsu champions in Vale Tudo and Submission matches. Luta Livre continued on with many famous fights in and out of the ring.  This included a fight with Rickson Gracie on the beaches of Brazil. This would hurt Luta Livre's reputation with Hugo Duarte losing to Rickson Gracie then getting knocked out by Tank Abbott at UFC 17 and Eugenio Tadeu losing to Wallid Ismael due to his inability to re-enter the ring in time. Tadeu did battle Royler Gracie to a draw in an indoor fight.  Another fight between Renzo Gracie and Eugenio Tadeu kept the rivalry going.  His battle with Renzo Gracie in 1997 ended in a No Contest due to fans rioting. In 1991 Desafio hosted a Jiu-Jitsu vs Luta Livre card that had three representatives of Brazilian jiu-jitsu up against three representatives of Luta Livre, with BJJ winning all three fights. One fighter Marco Ruas, who would later become a UFC champ, had a huge rivalry with Rickson Gracie. A fight though never occurred between the two fighters.

Decline in popularity and modern development 
While the feud between BJJ and Luta Livre was ongoing, BJJ started to gain the upper hand by spreading their art across Brazil and the rest of the world, something which Luta Livre wasn't doing due a lack of central leadership or interest in doing so. A branch of the Gracie family which established themselves in the United States did a Vale Tudo-style tournament in the form of the Ultimate Fighting Championship, which saw the early events resulting in the victory of Jiu-Jitsu practitioners and raising the awareness of the art across the globe. While Luta Livre kept its popularity limited to Rio de Janeiro and Manaus areas. As many events similar to the UFC were created in Brazil, United States and Japan, Luta Livre practitioners responded by signing up for those Vale Tudo and MMA events nationally and abroad. Marco Ruas was one of the first, becoming the champion of UFC 7, however, he was billed representing "Ruas Vale Tudo", his own fighting style which Luta Livre only composed a part of. Other Luta Livre fighters followed suit, such as Hugo Duarte, Pedro Otávio, Johil de Oliveira and Eugenio Tadeu, and they found mixed result in competitions. However, the main blow was that, as the nascent sport professionalized, most of the earlier most prestigious MMA academies (Brazilian Top Team, Chute Boxe Academy, Nova União, among others) used Brazilian Jiu-Jitsu as their submission grappling style. Many Luta Livre fighters left their original camps and went instead to the Jiu-Jitsu camps hoping for success in a fighting career. BJJ practitioners also stopped using the jiu-jitsu gi in MMA competitions (which later would be banned outright) and developed a style of BJJ without the gi, known as "No-Gi". Thus eliminating one of the main differentials between the two martial arts, and since many Luta Livre fighters were now practicing this new style, many of No-Gi's techniques and strategies were heavily influenced by Luta Livre.

Currently, there has been a lot of work to preserve Luta Livre and work towards a resurgence of the style. In 2017 the Confederação Brasileira de Luta Livre Esportiva (Brazilian Confederation of Luta Livre Esportiva) was founded in order to better organize and promote the sport. While it has also carved itself a niche in Europe, especially in Germany, where Luta Livre schools are common. Luta Livra was introduced in that country by Daniel D'Dane.

Ranking
The Brazilian Luta Livre Federation created a curriculum, and grading system, similar to the Brazilian jiu-jitsu ranking system and the Brazilian Judo ranking system, in order to develop uniform minimum standards, and better rank its practitioners. A black belt might take up to ten years of practice. Although it's a no-gi grappling style, practitioners can wear their belts if they want.

According to the Brazilian Luta Livre Federation, Rankings are divided into three categories: beginners, intermediate and advanced. Advanced students are allowed to be instructors

See also
Lucha Libre

References

External links
 Renovação Fight Team Deutschland (Germany)
 Complete History of Luta Livre
International Luta Livre (Esportiva-Vale Tudo) Federation
Federação de Luta-Livre Submission do Estado do Rio de Janeiro
European Luta Livre (Esportiva-Vale Tudo) Federation

Brazilian martial arts
Sports originating in Brazil
Mixed martial arts styles
Combat sports